The Red Mountain Yellowhammers is an old-time string band, originally known as The Red Mountain White Trash, from Birmingham, Alabama. A number of its members originally lived in Birmingham's Red Mountain neighborhood where they began playing together in 1985.

The band is composed of Jim Cauthen (fiddle), Joyce Cauthen (guitar), Phil Foster (mandolin), Jamie Finley (harmonica and banjo ukulele), Bill Martin (auto harp) and Nancy Jackson (bass).

Discography
Fire in the Dumpster (1995), Whoop It Up! #101
Chickens Don't Roost Too High (1999), Whoop It Up! #102
Sweet Bama (2002), Whoop It Up! #103
Throw the Old Cow Over the Fence (2009), Whoop It Up! #104

References

External links
Official site

American folk musical groups